Anzhela Stasyulevich (born 23 May 1967) is a Soviet diver. She competed in the women's 10 metre platform event at the 1988 Summer Olympics.

References

External links
 

1967 births
Living people
Soviet female divers
Olympic divers of the Soviet Union
Divers at the 1988 Summer Olympics
Sportspeople from Minsk